Get After It Media, formerly known as Luken Communications and Reach High Media Group, is a privately owned American broadcast holding company, based in Chattanooga, Tennessee, which owns or operates around 80 television stations in the United States and six digital television multicast networks.

History
Luken Communications was formed in 2008 by Henry Luken III, formerly president and CEO of Equity Media Holdings. Luken Communications agreed to purchase six TV stations from Equity Media for $17.5 million and paid a $5 million installment with the rest pending on regulatory approval. In June 2008, Equity sold to Luken Retro Television Network for $18.5 million and $8.05 million Equity warrants for $1.5 million.

On January 4, 2009, a contract conflict between Equity and Luken Communications interrupted RTN programming on many of its affiliates with Luken alleging that Equity had left many obligations to RTN's creditors, including programming suppliers, unpaid. As a result, Luken restored a national feed of the network from its Chattanooga headquarters. As a result of this dispute, Luken pulled out of a deal to purchase Equity's stations in southwestern Florida.

In June 2009, Luken and Seals Entertainment Company LLC launched the male-oriented digital multicast channel Tuff TV.  On March 22, 2011, Luken became part-owners of My Family TV in a joint venture with existing owner ValCom (the network later rebranded as The Family Channel after ValCom and Luken Communications ended their partnership). In June 2011, Luken Communications announced the purchase of 78 low-power translator stations from the Minority Media and Telecommunications Council for $390,000; the purchase was made in order to expand coverage of its ten existing and planned digital multicast networks with hopes to eventually acquire 400 low-power stations. In late summer 2011, Luken and Classic Media launched PBJ, featuring classic children's programs from the Classic Media library. With Frost Cutlery's shopping network and outdoor shows, Luken launched in 2011 the Frost Great Outdoors network.

On April 16, 2012, Luken Communications and Jim Owens Entertainment announced that the companies had teamed to relaunch The Nashville Network as a digital broadcast television network set for a late summer 2012 launch (TNN previously existed as a cable channel started by Gaylord Entertainment Company in 1983). The network was rebranded the next year as Heartland.

On June 21, 2013, an Arkansas jury awarded a $47.4 million verdict against Luken Communications for a claim of fraudulent transfer of the ownership of RTV six years prior. In order to appeal, Luken Communications filed for Chapter 11 bankruptcy as a protection measure. The appeal spanned more than a year but was ultimately successful, and in October 2014, the company announced it was emerging from bankruptcy protection and continued to grow and expand its network offerings. In December 2014, Luken Communications launched a new digital network, Rev'n, with a focus on automotive enthusiasts.

In December 2019, Luken Communications rebranded as Reach High Media Group, as Joel Wertman had by then taken over as President and CEO of the company from Luken. It again rebranded in early 2021 to Get After It Media, with Wertman remaining as President.

Assets owned by Get After It Media

Digital multicast networks
 The Family Channel
 Heartland, formerly The Nashville Network
 Retro TV
 The Action Channel
 Rev'n

Broadcast television stations
Notes: All stations are owned by Digital Networks, LLC. Many of these stations were former Trinity Broadcasting Network (TBN) translators, unless specified.
1 Indicates stations were not previously owned by TBN
2 Indicates flagship station
3 Indicates station managed by Great Plains Television Network, LLC

References

External links
Official website

Television broadcasting companies of the United States
Companies based in Chattanooga, Tennessee
Mass media companies established in 2008
2008 establishments in Tennessee
Television networks in the United States